Cryphaea is the scientific name of two genera of organisms and may refer to:

Cryphaea (moth), a genus of insects in the family Geometridae
Cryphaea (plant), a genus of plants in the family Cryphaeaceae